Roshchinsky (masculine), Roshchinskaya (feminine), or Roshchinskoye (neuter) may refer to:
Roshchinsky Urban Settlement, a municipal formation which the urban-type settlement of Roshchinsky in Volzhsky District of Samara Oblast, Russia is incorporated as
Roshchinskoye Urban Settlement, a municipal formation corresponding to Roshchinskoye Settlement Municipal Formation, an administrative division of Vyborgsky District of Leningrad Oblast, Russia
Roshchinsky (inhabited locality) (Roshchinskaya, Roshchinskoye), several inhabited localities in Russia